Hervé Ryssen (Real name: Hervé Lalin, Born: April 10, 1967) is a French writer, militant nationalist, Holocaust denier and antisemite. He is close to the circles of extreme right. He considers himself racist, anti-jewish and anti-semite, his publications and videos resulted in numerous complaints and court orders, which resulted in him being jailed for 17-month in September 2020.

Early life 
Ryssen was born as Hervé Lalin on April 10, 1967, in Bondy, France. He obtained a master's degree in history from Paris-East Créteil University(Val-de-Marne) in 1991. His thesis focused on Spanish civil war. He was a history teacher for five years but he was expelled from educational system following complaints. He regards himself as an unemployed professor.

Ryssen was originally an anarchist and libertarian, but over time he became more right wing and joined National Front in the 1990s. On September 16, 2002, he put a pie on the face of a priest who was helping migrants and foreigners. This action was widely covered and he became well known since the incident.

In 2010s a campaign of antisemitic posters brought Ryssen to spotlight.

From 2005 to 2015 Ryssen wrote many books and articles about Judaism, eschatology and anti-white racism. In 2015 he made a documentary called Satan in Hollywood, which he criticized Jewish influence and anti-catholic bias. His book, Anti-white racism, assassins of white men, became a best seller in France.

He participated in the yellow vest movement, and a photo of him landed on the cover of Paris Match.

In 2018 he played tribute to Robert Faurisson and wrote in his Twitter that Faurisson will be a French name talked about in 200 years.

In September 2020 he was convicted to prison for anti-semitic remarks and holocaust denial, a crime in France.

Theories 
In his book, Psychoanalysis of Judaism, Ryssen compares Judaism to a hysterical pathology, and believes that Judaism results in anxiety, paranoia, depression, amnesia, sexual misconduct, incest, identity disorder. He believes that the unity between Jewish forces across the globe comes from their universal belief in the Jewish Messiah and communism and interbreeding will be two facets of this Messiah.

Publications

Books 
  Planetary Hopes, Levallois-Perret, ed. Baskerville,2005, 430 p. , 22 cm ( ISBN 2-9524559-0-2, BnF record no  . FRBNF40037166 )
 Psychoanalysis of Judaism, Levallois-Perret, ed. Baskerville,2006, 397 p. , 22 cm ( ISBN 978-2-9524559-5-4, BnF record no  . FRBNF40187707 )
 Jewish Fanaticism: Equality – Human Rights – Tolerance, Levallois-Perret, ed. Baskerville,2007, 395  p. , 22 cm ( ISBN  978-2-9524559-1-6, BnF record no  . FRBNF41075206 )
 The Jewish Mafia: The Great International Predators, Levallois-Perret, ed. Baskerville,2008, 395  p. , 22 cm ( ISBN  978-2-9524559-2-3, BnF notice no  . FRBNF41296945 )- translated into English
 The Mirror of Judaism: The Accusatory Inversion, Levallois-Perret, ed. Baskerville,2009, 397  p. , 22 cm ( ISBN  978-2-9524559-7-8, BnF record no  . FRBNF41442426 )
 History of anti-Semitism: seen by a goy and returned to the place, Levallois-Perret, ed. Baskerville,2010, 432  p. , 22 cm ( ISBN  978-2-9524559-3-0, BnF notice no  . FRBNF42408430 )
 Anti-white Racism: Assassins of white men – Killers, rapists of white women, Levallois-Perret, ed. Baskerville,2011, 320  p. , not known ( ISBN  978-2-9524559-8-5 )Bibliographic notice apparently absent from the General Catalog of the National Library of France.
 Understanding Judaism, Understanding Anti-Semitism, Levallois-Perret, ed. Baskerville,2012, 144  p. , 15 cm ( ISBN  979-10-91246-00-2, BnF notice no  . FRBNF43613000 )
 The Eschatological War: The End of Times in the Great Religions, Levallois-Perret, ed. Baskerville,2013, 185  p. , 22 cm ( ISBN  979-10-91246-01-9, BnF record no  . FRBNF43613003 )
 Israel's Billions: Jewish Swindlers & International Financiers, ed. Baskerville,2014, 330  p. , 22 cm ( ISBN  979-10-91246-02-6, BnF notice no  . FRBNF43899584 )
 Satan in Hollywood, ed. Baskerville,2015
 Anti-Semitism, without complex or taboo: Plea for freedom of expression, ed. Baskerville,2018, 272  p..

Documentaries

 Satan in Hollywood (2015)
 Jews and Incest (2016)
 Jews, Communism and the Russian Revolution of 1917 (2017)
 Jews and World Unification (2017)
 Anti-Semitism for Dummies (2017)
 The Sephardic Connection (2017)
 The Jewish Mafia (2017)
 Why Anti-Semitism (2020)

References 

French conspiracy theorists
Living people
French Holocaust deniers
Anti-Zionism in France
21st-century French writers
Year of birth missing (living people)